Esquipulas Palo Gordo is a town and municipality in the San Marcos department of Guatemala.  The town was founded on 24 December 1826 year. In the 1920s it was merged with San Marcos, but in 1948 it recovered its autonomy again.

Political division

Natural resources 

Natural resources in the municipality are mainly cattle, forestry and agriculture.  The main agricultural products are: sugar cane, corn, wheat, potato, and beans; the land is flat and fertile.

Tourism

Esquipulas Palo Gordo has several natural attractions; among them is Ixtagel hill and the Quetzal refuge in Fraternidad village, along with a large forest area that covers approximately 50% of the municipal area and has extensive fauna variety.

The municipality celebrates its annual fair in honor of the Black Christ of Esquipulas between January 12 and 17.

Politics 
In 2011, a woman joined the mayoral race in Esquipulas Palo Gordo for the very first time, when Edilma Marleny Ochoa Barrios ran for Unión del Cambio Nacional —UCN—.

Climate

Esquipulas Palo Gordo has temperate climate (Köppen:Cwb).

Geographic location 

Esquipulas Palo Gordo can be reached two ways:
From Guatemala City to San Marcos: Ruta Interamericana, 252 km highway
From San Marcos: 7.5 km national route

It is surrounded by San Marcos Department municipalities:

See also

 La Aurora International Airport
 Tapachula International Airport

References

External links
 Film documentary: Esquipulas Palo Gordo
 Film documentary: Esquipulas Palo Gordo (2)
Some information (in Spanish)

Municipalities of the San Marcos Department